Jenny Apostolou (also known as Jen Apostolou) is an Australian actress who is best known for her roles in the television series TwentyfourSeven  and the children's television series Double Trouble. Apostolou has also had a number of roles in other television series such as Out of the Blue, Water Rats, Heartbreak High, Police Rescue, G.P. and The Ferals.

References

External links

20th-century Australian actresses
21st-century Australian actresses
Australian television actresses
Living people
Year of birth missing (living people)